(November 9, 1924 – January 29, 2015) was a Japanese composer. He wrote scores for numerous science fiction, horror, and kaiju films.

Filmography 
 Suzaki paradise: Akashingō (洲崎パラダイス　赤信号 Suzaki paradaisu Akashingō) aka Suzaki Paradise Red Light (1956)
 Hungry Soul (飢える魂) (1956)
 Summer Storm (夏の嵐 Natsu no arashi) (1956)
 Super Giant - The Artificial Satellite and the Destruction of Humanity (スーパー・ジャイアンツ 人工衛星と人類の破滅 - Sūpā Jaiantsu - Jinkō Eisei to Jinrui no Hametsu) (1957)
 Super Giant - The Spaceship and the Clash of the Artificial Satellite (スーパー・ジャイアンツ 宇宙艇と人工衛星の激突 - Sūpā Jaiantsu - Uchūtei to Jinkō Eisei no Gekitotsu) (1958)
 Kokoro to nikutai no tabi (完全な遊戯) (1958)
 Kanzenna yûgi (1958)
 Nora neko (1958)
 Noren (暖簾)(1958)
 Onna o wasurero	(1959)
 Yoru no togyo	(1959)
 High Teen	(1959)
 Jigoku no magarikado	(1959)
 A Street of Love and Hope	(Ai to kibô no machi) (1959)
 Room for Let (Kashima ari) (1959)
 The Five Jolly Thieves	(Shiranami gonin otoko: tenka no ô-dorobô) (1960)
 Hito mo arukeba	(1960)
 Cruel Story of Youth (1960)
 The Sun's Burial	(1960)
 Kenka Tarô	(1960)
 Night and Fog in Japan	(1960)
 Ponkotsu	(1960)
 'Akasaka no shimai' yori: yoru no hada	(1960)
 Shôjo	(1961)
 Romance Express	(1961)
 Aoi me no sugao	(1961)
 Kono wakasa aru kagiri	(1961)
 Kill the Killer!	(1961)
 Keishichô monogatari: jûni-nin no keiji	(1961)
 Machi	(1961)
 A Wife Confesses	(1961)
 The Catch	(1961)
 Urusai imôtotachi	(1961)
 Shiro Amakusa, the Christian Rebel	(1962)
 Heso no taisho	(1962)
 Gang domei	(1963)
 Fushigina Kusuri (Short)	(1965)
 Hatoba no taka	(1967)
 The Smell of Poison	(1967)
 Kamo to negi	(1968)
 Â Himeyuri no Tô	(1968)
 Sogeki	(1968)
 Front Row Life	(1968)
 Fukushû no uta ga kikoeru	(1968)
 Stormy Era	(1969)
 Burakku comedi	(1969)
 Oretachi no kôya	(1969)
 Koto no taiyo	(1969)
 Yakuza bangaichi	(1969)
 Exiled to Hell	(1969)
 Cruel Female Love Suicide (残酷おんな情死 Zankoku onna jōshi) (1970)
 Oiroke komikku	(1970)
 Kigeki kudabare! Otoko-dama	(1970)
 Terror in the Streets	(1970)
 The Vampire Doll	(1970)
 The Militarists	(1970)
 Winter in Narita (Documentary)	(1970)
 Profile of a Boss's Son	(1970)
 Showa hito keta shachô tai futaketa shain	(1971)
 Lake of Dracula	(1971)
 Godzilla vs. Hedorah	(1971)
 Zoku Showa hito keta shachô tai futaketa shain: Getsu-getsu kasui moku kinkin	(1971)
 Hakuchô no uta nanka kikoenai	(1972)
 Love Hunter (1972)
 Manatsu no Yoru no Jôji	(1972)
 Wolf Guy	(1973)
 Godzilla vs. Megalon	(1973)
 Ame no yo no jôji	(1973)
 Hitozuma: nokoribi	(1973)
 Onna kyôshi: Amai seikatsu	(1973)
 Hirusagari no jôji: Uwasa no kangofu	(1974)
 Flower and Snake	(1974)
 Evil of Dracula	(1974)
 Okita Sôji	(1974)
 The Gate of Youth	(1975)
 Akan ni hatsu	(1975)
 Kamome-yo, kirameku umi o mitaka/meguri ai	(1975)
 The Possessed	(1976)
 Boko!	(1976)
 Gakusei mabu: shojo no aji	(1976)
 The Gate of Youth Part 2	(1977)
 Shûdôjo Rushia: Kegasu	(1978)
 Tatsu no ko Taro	(1979)
 Jigoku	(1979)
 Taiyo no ko teda no fua	(1980)

Notes

Sources
 
Riichiro Manabe Homeage 
 

1924 births
2015 deaths
Japanese film score composers
Japanese male film score composers
Video game composers